Burnham Deepdale  is a village and former civil parish, now in the parish of Brancaster, in the King's Lynn and West Norfolk district, on the north coast of the county of Norfolk, England. Burnham Deepdale, Brancaster and Brancaster Staithe form a more or less continuous settlement along the A149, at the edge of the Brancaster Manor marshland and the Scolt Head Island National Nature Reserve. In 1931 the parish had a population of 81.

History
Burnham Deepdale's name is of Anglo-Saxon origin and derives from the Old English for a settlement along the River Burn with a deep valley. On 1 April 1935 the parish was abolished and merged with Brancaster.

Geography
The village is one of the original seven Burnhams, which include Burnham Norton, Burnham Overy, Burnham Sutton, Burnham Thorpe, Burnham Ulph and Burnham Westgate.

St Mary's Church
Burnham Deepdale's Parish church is one of Norfolk's 124 remaining Anglo-Saxon round-tower churches, and is dedicated to Saint Mary. St Mary's was significantly remodelled in the 1870s by Frederick Preedy.

Buildings and amenities
Burnham Deepdale is home to the 'Deepdale Cafe'.

Both Burnham Deepdale and Brancaster offer accommodation in holiday cottages, hostels, camping, hotels and bed & breakfasts. Village life centres on the harbour and its thriving fishing and sailing community.

Notable residents
Rupert Everett- English actor, director and producer

War Memorial
Burnham Deepdale's War Memorial takes the form of a shrine located in St Mary's churchyard. It lists the following names for the First World War:
 Chief-Stoker Robert I. Winterborne (1878-1917), HMS Vanguard
 Sergeant Harold N. D. Guthrie (1894-1917), 7th Battalion, Royal Fusiliers
 Lance-Corporal Albert J. West (1893-1916), 8th Battalion, East Surrey Regiment
 Lance-Corporal Bede Guthrie (1896-1917), 1/5th Battalion, Gloucestershire Regiment
 Private Henry Mitchell (1882-1917), 8th Battalion, Bedfordshire Regiment
 Private Robert Mack (d.1916), 8th Battalion, East Surrey Regiment
 Private Herbert Martins (1881-1916), 12th Battalion, East Surrey Regiment
 Private Percy Williamson (d.1918), 11th Battalion, Royal Sussex Regiment
 Private Herbert Hubbard (d.1917), 1st Battalion, Essex Regiment
 Private Russell Sutherland (1896-1917), 120th Company, Machine Gun Corps
 Private William J. Billing (d.1916), 7th Battalion, Royal Norfolk Regiment
 Private Herbert Youngs (1895-1915), 7th Battalion, Royal Norfolk Regiment
 Private Burton P. Loose (1895-1918), 9th Battalion, Royal Norfolk Regiment

And, the following for the Second World War:
 Sergeant Sidney A. J. Mahoney (1914-1944), 10th Battalion, Royal Berkshire Regiment
 Gunner Gordon B. Stringer (1920-1944), 2nd (Medium) Regiment, Royal Artillery
 Trooper Arthur Osborne (d.1941), 1st Royal Tank Regiment, Royal Armoured Corps

References

External links

Villages in Norfolk
Populated coastal places in Norfolk
Former civil parishes in Norfolk
Brancaster